June Rockwell Levy (1886-1971) was an American philanthropist who was inducted into the Rhode Island Heritage Hall of Fame alongside her husband in 1999. In 1963, she received the Order of the British Empire from Queen Elizabeth II. She was known as the "First Lady of Burrillville."

Biography 
June Rockwell Levy was born on June 14, 1886, in Brooklyn, N.Y. In 1891, she moved with her family to Bristol, Rhode Island. She studied in Paris and at Rosemary Hall, later going to the Rhode Island School of Design. Due to a sickness, she was unable to receive a degree from the school. She was a Trustee of Lincoln School, Chair of the Providence Art Club's Ladies Board, President of the Providence Garden Club, and Northwest Community Healthcare (which she would serve 51 consecutive terms as president of). She funded Burrillville, Rhode Island's Town Hall, high school, library, community theater, public health nursing buildings and an indoor ice‐skating rink.

The June Rockwell Levy Foundation was created in honor of her in 1947. In addition to funding scholarships to the University of Rhode Island and University of Brandeis, the foundation donated extensively to medical establishments. The University of Rhode Island awarded Levy an honorary degree.

References 

1971 deaths
1886 births
American women philanthropists
Members of the Order of the British Empire
Philanthropists from Rhode Island
People from Brooklyn
Rhode Island School of Design alumni
Philanthropists from New York (state)
20th-century American philanthropists
People from Bristol, Rhode Island
20th-century women philanthropists